The  or  (Dutch) is a central boulevard in Brussels, Belgium. It was created following the covering of the river Senne (1867–1871), and bears the name of Adolphe Max, a former mayor of the City of Brussels.

The Boulevard Adolphe Max is located between the Place de Brouckère/De Brouckèreplein and the Place Charles Rogier/Karel Rogierplein, in the extension of the Boulevard Anspach/Anspachlaan. It runs parallel to Brussels' busiest shopping street, the Rue Neuve/Nieuwstraat. It is served by the metro and premetro (underground tram) stations De Brouckère (on lines 1, 3, 4 and 5) and Rogier (on lines 2, 3, 4 and 6).

History
The Boulevard Adolphe Max was built between 1867 and 1871, as part of the North–South Axis, which was created after the covering of the river Senne. To stimulate the new boulevard's development, an architectural competition was organised. The boulevard was originally named the / ("North Boulevard"), since it led to the old North Station on the Place Charles Rogier. In 1919, it was renamed in honour of the then-mayor of the City of Brussels, Adolphe Max (1869–1939).

Until the Second World War, the Boulevard Adolphe Max was one of the liveliest streets in Brussels, with renowned shops, typical Brussels cafés and an impressive number of cinemas. On 4 September 1944, it was the scene of great jubilation during the liberation of Brussels by the British Guards Armoured Division. From the 1970s, however, the area entered a period of urban decay. Almost all the old shops disappeared, and in their place, souvenir shops, snack bars and sex shops opened. The luxurious Hotel Le Plaza, located on the boulevard, also closed its doors in 1976. Since 1976, the North–South line of the Brussels premetro has run underneath the boulevard. The reopening of the Hotel Le Plaza in 1998 marked the beginning of a certain revival. By the turn of the 21st century, only a few sex cinemas remained. The last one, the ABC, closed in 2014.

In recent years, the introduction of one-way traffic on the side near the Place de Brouckère has reduced the traffic volume considerably. There are also currently plans to renovate the Boulevard Adolphe Max and its surrounding streets, as part of the broader revitalisation of the city centre.

Notable buildings
The Boulevard Adolphe Max is home to many buildings in neoclassical, Beaux-Arts, Art Nouveau, Art Deco and eclectic styles. Some examples include:
 No. 5–9: Hotel Atlanta (1925–1929), an Art Deco hotel by 
 No. 11–17: Thonet House (1872), an eclectic apartment building by 
 No. 104: Marivaux theatre, original neoclassical building (1873) by D.G. Marinus, Art Deco redesign (1923) by G. Hubrecht
 No. 118–126: Hotel Le Plaza (1928), an Art Deco hotel and cinema, by Alfred Hoch and Michel Polak

See also

 List of streets in Brussels
 Neoclassical architecture in Belgium
 Art Nouveau in Brussels
 Art Deco in Brussels
 History of Brussels
 Belgium in "the long nineteenth century"

References

Notes

Bibliography
 
 
 

Streets in Brussels
City of Brussels
19th century in Brussels